Stevenage railway station serves the town of Stevenage in Hertfordshire, England. Stevenage is served and managed by Great Northern, who operate Thameslink stopping services southbound to King’s Cross via stations such as Welwyn Garden City and Potter’s Bar, to Brighton and Horsham via Central London and Gatwick Airport and to Moorgate via Watton-at-Stone, Hertford North and Enfield Chase and services northbound to Cambridge and Peterborough. It is also frequently served by London North Eastern Railway, who operate fast non-stopping services southbound towards London and northbound towards cities including York, Leeds and Edinburgh. Hull Trains and Lumo operate very limited services from the station.

The present station was opened for trains on 23 July 1973. The station was built by British Rail.

History
The original Stevenage railway station was built in 1850 by the Great Northern Railway, despite the apparent hostility towards the railway being built there at that time due to the inevitable decline it would cause to local coach businesses, which all ended shortly after the station was opened.

In 1946, Stevenage became one of the first New Towns, which resulted in a new town centre.

In 2021, a tactile map was installed, in collaboration with the Royal National Institute of Blind People, to help blind and partially sighted passengers navigate the station.

Facilities
The station has two separate ticket offices (Great Northern and London North Eastern Railway), but in practice, each also sells the other's tickets. There are also seven ticket machines. There are toilets at street level (but not on the platforms) and lifts from the station building to both platforms.

The station also has automatic ticket barriers, which were installed by First Capital Connect (the previous train operator) shortly after it took over the route, as a revenue protection exercise, and to improve security at the station. There is a snack bar, at street level, and two coffee bars at platform level, with one per platform. The newsagent previously at street level closed in March 2014, pending the redevelopment of the station which has since been completed.
Since December 2013, the previous train operator, First Capital Connect started refurbishing the station completely, introducing passenger lifts between platform and street level, and refurbishing the concourse area plus retail units. The works were due to be completed by April 2014, but were delayed. Since Great Northern took over the franchise in September 2014, these works have been completed.

Both island platforms have indoor waiting rooms that were refurbished in May 2012 as part of a wider scheme to refurbish and add waiting rooms across the Great Northern Route, and there is also outdoor seating along the length of the platforms.

The station is a short walk on a walkway from Stevenage Bus Station and is opposite a leisure complex that includes the Gordon Craig Theatre.

Services

Great Northern 
These services start and finish at Stevenage using Platform 5 at the station, which opened in 2020. These services are operated using  EMUs.

These services are operated using  EMUs.

London North Eastern Railway

London North Eastern Railway generally serve Stevenage with two trains per hour in each direction during the day.

Services are operated using  bi-mode trains and  EMUs.

Hull Trains

Hull Trains operate a limited service at Stevenage on Sunday afternoons only. Services are operated using  bi-mode trains.

Thameslink services
As of May 2018, most services at Stevenage are operated by Thameslink using  EMUs.

The typical off-peak service in trains per hour is:
 2 tph to  via London Bridge,  and Gatwick Airport 
 2 tph to Cambridge (semi-fast)

On Sundays, the services between Brighton and Cambridge and Peterborough and Horsham are reduced to hourly, with the service to Horsham terminating at London King's Cross.

Lumo
As of October 2021, Lumo operate a number of service at Stevenage. Services are operated using  EMUs.

Additional platform
Until May 2018 most weekday trains on the Hertford Loop Line were extended to Letchworth, as there was insufficient capacity to accommodate terminating trains at Stevenage. However, in 2018, Govia Thameslink Railway cut back all services to start/terminate at Stevenage. To help alleviate the capacity problem, an additional south-facing bay platform at Stevenage which allows Great Northern trains on the Hertford Loop Line to terminate here - similar to the arrangement at Welwyn Garden City - increasing capacity on both the Hertford Loop and the East Coast Main Line, and allow for an enhanced service frequency on both routes was officially opened on 3 August 2020.

References

External links

Railway stations in Hertfordshire
DfT Category C1 stations
Former Great Northern Railway stations
Railway stations in Great Britain opened in 1850
Railway stations in Great Britain closed in 1973
Railway stations opened by British Rail
Railway stations in Great Britain opened in 1973
1850 establishments in England
Railway stations served by Govia Thameslink Railway
Railway stations served by Hull Trains
Railway stations served by London North Eastern Railway
Railway stations served by Lumo
Stevenage